Kerabari Rural Municipality is a Gaupalika (rural municipality) located at Morang district. Letang Bhogateni Municipality (Ward no.1), Kerabari, Yangshila, Singhadevi and Patigaun VDCs were incorporated into Kerabari Gaupalika. This rural municipality has an area of 219.83 km2. The population as of 2017 is 30,431. The current VDC Office of Kerabari is the office of this Gaupalika.

References 

 
Rural municipalities of Nepal established in 2017
Rural municipalities in Koshi Province
Rural municipalities in Morang District